Michthisoma is a genus of long-horned beetles in the family Cerambycidae, containing a single described species, Michthisoma heterodoxum.

References

Further reading

 
 

Spondylidinae
Monotypic Cerambycidae genera
Articles created by Qbugbot